The 1st constituency of Cantal is a French legislative constituency in the Cantal département.

Deputies

Election results

2022

2017

2012

|- style="background-color:#E9E9E9;text-align:center;"
! colspan="2" rowspan="2" style="text-align:left;" | Candidate
! rowspan="2" colspan="2" style="text-align:left;" | Party
! colspan="2" | 1st round
! colspan="2" | 2nd round
|- style="background-color:#E9E9E9;text-align:center;"
! width="75" | Votes
! width="30" | %
! width="75" | Votes
! width="30" | %
|-
| style="background-color:" |
| style="text-align:left;" | Alain Calmette
| style="text-align:left;" | Socialist Party
| PS
| 
| 42.92%
| 
| 51.63%
|-
| style="background-color:" |
| style="text-align:left;" | Vincent Descœur
| style="text-align:left;" | Union for a Popular Movement
| UMP
| 
| 41.23%
| 
| 48.37%
|-
| style="background-color:" |
| style="text-align:left;" | Philippe Drouault
| style="text-align:left;" | Front National
| FN
| 
| 5.41%
| colspan="2" style="text-align:left;" |
|-
| style="background-color:" |
| style="text-align:left;" | Thierry Galeau
| style="text-align:left;" | Left Front
| FG
| 
| 3.37%
| colspan="2" style="text-align:left;" |
|-
| style="background-color:" |
| style="text-align:left;" | Vincent Bessat
| style="text-align:left;" | Europe Ecology – The Greens
| EELV
| 
| 2.62%
| colspan="2" style="text-align:left;" |
|-
| style="background-color:" |
| style="text-align:left;" | Chantal Mazieres
| style="text-align:left;" | Miscellaneous Left
| DVG
| 
| 2.01%
| colspan="2" style="text-align:left;" |
|-
| style="background-color:" |
| style="text-align:left;" | Nicole Soulenq-Moissinac
| style="text-align:left;" | 
| CEN
| 
| 1.97%
| colspan="2" style="text-align:left;" |
|-
| style="background-color:" |
| style="text-align:left;" | Rémy Dauvillier
| style="text-align:left;" | Far Left
| EXG
| 
| 0.45%
| colspan="2" style="text-align:left;" |
|-
| style="background-color:" |
| style="text-align:left;" | François Bre
| style="text-align:left;" | Other
| AUT
| 
| 0.01%
| colspan="2" style="text-align:left;" |
|-
| colspan="8" style="background-color:#E9E9E9;"|
|- style="font-weight:bold"
| colspan="4" style="text-align:left;" | Total
| 
| 100%
| 
| 100%
|-
| colspan="8" style="background-color:#E9E9E9;"|
|-
| colspan="4" style="text-align:left;" | Registered voters
| 
| style="background-color:#E9E9E9;"|
| 
| style="background-color:#E9E9E9;"|
|-
| colspan="4" style="text-align:left;" | Blank/Void ballots
| 
| 1.13%
| 
| 1.71%
|-
| colspan="4" style="text-align:left;" | Turnout
| 
| 63.15%
| 
| 67.49%
|-
| colspan="4" style="text-align:left;" | Abstentions
| 
| 36.85%
| 
| 32.51%
|-
| colspan="8" style="background-color:#E9E9E9;"|
|- style="font-weight:bold"
| colspan="6" style="text-align:left;" | Result
| colspan="2" style="background-color:" | PS gain from UMP
|}

2007

|- style="background-color:#E9E9E9;text-align:center;"
! colspan="2" rowspan="2" style="text-align:left;" | Candidate
! rowspan="2" colspan="2" style="text-align:left;" | Party
! colspan="2" | 1st round
! colspan="2" | 2nd round
|- style="background-color:#E9E9E9;text-align:center;"
! width="75" | Votes
! width="30" | %
! width="75" | Votes
! width="30" | %
|-
| style="background-color:" |
| style="text-align:left;" | Vincent Descœur
| style="text-align:left;" | Union for a Popular Movement
| UMP
| 
| 44.45%
| 
| 55.96%
|-
| style="background-color:" |
| style="text-align:left;" | Jacques Markarian
| style="text-align:left;" | Socialist Party
| PS
| 
| 29.26%
| 
| 44.04%
|-
| style="background-color:" |
| style="text-align:left;" | François Vermande
| style="text-align:left;" | Miscellaneous Right
| DVD
| 
| 10.36%
| colspan="2" style="text-align:left;" |
|-
| style="background-color:" |
| style="text-align:left;" | Christiane Missegue
| style="text-align:left;" | Democratic Movement
| MoDem
| 
| 4.72%
| colspan="2" style="text-align:left;" |
|-
| style="background-color:" |
| style="text-align:left;" | Patrick Perrier
| style="text-align:left;" | Communist
| PCF
| 
| 3.55%
| colspan="2" style="text-align:left;" |
|-
| style="background-color:" |
| style="text-align:left;" | Vincent Bessat
| style="text-align:left;" | The Greens
| VEC
| 
| 2.87%
| colspan="2" style="text-align:left;" |
|-
| style="background-color:" |
| style="text-align:left;" | Véronique Bamas
| style="text-align:left;" | Far Left
| EXG
| 
| 1.88%
| colspan="2" style="text-align:left;" |
|-
| style="background-color:" |
| style="text-align:left;" | Thierry Krzeminski
| style="text-align:left;" | Front National
| FN
| 
| 1.33%
| colspan="2" style="text-align:left;" |
|-
| style="background-color:" |
| style="text-align:left;" | Rémy Dauvillier
| style="text-align:left;" | Far Left
| EXG
| 
| 0.63%
| colspan="2" style="text-align:left;" |
|-
| style="background-color:" |
| style="text-align:left;" | Yolande Trouillet
| style="text-align:left;" | Movement for France
| MPF
| 
| 0.53%
| colspan="2" style="text-align:left;" |
|-
| style="background-color:" |
| style="text-align:left;" | François Bre
| style="text-align:left;" | Independent
| DIV
| 
| 0.27%
| colspan="2" style="text-align:left;" |
|-
| style="background-color:" |
| style="text-align:left;" | Christine Gaymard
| style="text-align:left;" | Independent
| DIV
| 
| 0.13%
| colspan="2" style="text-align:left;" |
|-
| colspan="8" style="background-color:#E9E9E9;"|
|- style="font-weight:bold"
| colspan="4" style="text-align:left;" | Total
| 
| 100%
| 
| 100%
|-
| colspan="8" style="background-color:#E9E9E9;"|
|-
| colspan="4" style="text-align:left;" | Registered voters
| 
| style="background-color:#E9E9E9;"|
| 
| style="background-color:#E9E9E9;"|
|-
| colspan="4" style="text-align:left;" | Blank/Void ballots
| 
| 1.96%
| 
| 3.00%
|-
| colspan="4" style="text-align:left;" | Turnout
| 
| 63.90%
| 
| 64.24%
|-
| colspan="4" style="text-align:left;" | Abstentions
| 
| 36.10%
| 
| 35.76%
|-
| colspan="8" style="background-color:#E9E9E9;"|
|- style="font-weight:bold"
| colspan="6" style="text-align:left;" | Result
| colspan="2" style="background-color:" | UMP HOLD
|}

2002

 
 
 
 
 
 
 
 
 
 
|-
| colspan="8" bgcolor="#E9E9E9"|
|-

1997

 
 
 
 
 
 
 
|-
| colspan="8" bgcolor="#E9E9E9"|
|-

References

Sources
 French Interior Ministry results website: 

French legislative constituencies of Cantal